Mohammad Rahmatullah (Bengali: মোহাম্মদ রহমতুল্লাহ) was an Indian footballer who played as a forward for the India national team and spent most of his career with Calcutta Football League giant Mohammedan Sporting. He also appeared with Bangladeshi outfit Dhaka Mohammedan and became the first Indian in post-independence period to take the international transfer, the other being legendary Mohammed Salim, who played for Celtic. After 1962, he also represented Pakistan in international football.

Club career

Kolkata Mohammedan
Rahmatullah moved to Calcutta Football League giant Mohammedan Sporting during the first half of the 1950s and won the league in 1957. With Mohammedan, he won the IFA Shield in that year, and won Rovers Cup thrice in 1955, 1957 and 1958.

Rahmatullah was instrumental in winning the Aga Khan Gold Cup in Bangladesh, in 1960, the first ever tournament win by an Indian club in foreign soil. They defeated Indonesia's Persatuan Sepakbola Makassar 4–1 in the final, in which he scored a goal.

Dhaka Mohammedan
In 1962, he moved to Dhaka Mohammedan and became the second Indian to play for an overseas club. He appeared in Dhaka League during his days in Bangladesh.

Bengal
Rahmatullah also represented Balaidas Chatterjee managed Bengal football team at the Santosh Trophy and won the tournament thrice in 1953–54, 1955–56, and 1958–59 seasons.

International career
Rahmatullah made his senior international debut for India against Burma on 26 May 1958 in the 1958 Asian Games, that ended up a 3–2 win in favour of them. He scored his first international goal against Indonesia on 28 May in the same tournament. In the quarterfinal, India defeated Hong Kong 5–2, with two goals by Rahmatullah, and one each by the trio of Chuni Goswami, Tulsidas Balaram and D. Damodaran. They finished on fourth position as they lost 1–4 to Indonesia in the bronze media match at Japan National Stadium.

The next year he traveled to Malaysia where India took part in the Merdeka Cup and finished as runners-up. He was in the squad, as India began the 1960s with the 1960 AFC Asian Cup qualifiers. Despite the qualifiers for the West Zone being held in Kochi, India finished last in their qualification group and thus missed out the tournament.

In national team, Rahmatullah's teammates under coach Syed Abdul Rahim, were like: Ahmed Hussain, Peter Thangaraj, Nikhil Nandy, Samar Banerjee, P. K. Banerjee, Kesto Pal, Neville Stephen D'Souza, Tulsidas Balaram, Sayed Khwaja Aziz-ud-Din, Abdul Latif, Mariappa Kempiah, Chuni Goswami, Kannan. Between 1958 and 1961, he appeared in nineteen international matches for India, scoring five goals.

Personal life
On 12 March 2014, Rahmatullah was admitted to a hospital in California for an open heart surgery.

Honours
Mohammedan Sporting (Kolkata)
 Calcutta Football League: 1957
 IFA Shield: 1957
 Aga Khan Gold Cup: 1960
 Rovers Cup: 1955, 1957, 1958
 Coochbehar Cup: 1952
 Durand Cup: runner-up 1959

Bengal
 Santosh Trophy: 1953–54, 1955–56, 1958–59

India
Merdeka Tournament runner-up: 1959

See also
List of Indian football players in foreign leagues
List of association footballers who have been capped for two senior national teams
India–Pakistan football rivalry

References

Bibliography

External links

1933 births
Living people
Indian footballers
Association football forwards
Footballers at the 1958 Asian Games
Asian Games competitors for India
Footballers from Kolkata
Mohammedan SC (Kolkata) players
Mohammedan SC (Dhaka) players
India international footballers
Pakistani footballers
Pakistan international footballers
Indian expatriate footballers
Expatriate footballers in Bangladesh
Indian expatriate sportspeople in Bangladesh
Calcutta Football League players
Dual internationalists (football)